Leandro Miguel Pereira da Silva (born 4 May 1994) is a Portuguese professional footballer who plays as a midfielder for Israeli club Hapoel Haifa.

Club career
Born in Castelo de Paiva, Aveiro District, Silva joined FC Porto's youth system at the age of 12. On 21 August 2013 he made his professional debut with the reserves, coming on as a 67th-minute substitute for Thibaut Vion in a 1–0 away win against Portimonense S.C. in the Segunda Liga. On 22 April 2015, in the semi-finals of the Premier League International Cup, he scored all of his team's goals to help overcome Fulham 3–0.

Silva spent the 2015–16 and 2016–17 seasons on loan in the Primeira Liga, respectively at Académica de Coimbra and F.C. Paços de Ferreira. Due to lack of playing opportunities at the latter he was recalled by his parent club on 26 December 2016, being re-loaned to Académica shortly after.

In the summer of 2017, Silva signed with AEL Limassol in the Cypriot First Division. He served two Portuguese second tier loans until the end of his contract, at Académica and F.C. Arouca; he contributed 31 matches and one goal in his first season at the latter side, helping to a return to the top flight after four years.

Already on a permanent two-year deal at Arouca, Silva registered the exact same figures in the 2021–22 campaign as they managed to stay afloat.

International career
All youth levels comprised, Silva earned 55 caps for Portugal. He made his debut for the under-21 side on 24 March 2016, in a 4–0 home victory over Liechtenstein in the 2017 UEFA European Under-21 Championship qualifiers.

References

External links

1994 births
Living people
People from Castelo de Paiva
Sportspeople from Aveiro District
Portuguese footballers
Association football midfielders
Primeira Liga players
Liga Portugal 2 players
Padroense F.C. players
FC Porto B players
Associação Académica de Coimbra – O.A.F. players
F.C. Paços de Ferreira players
F.C. Arouca players
Cypriot First Division players
AEL Limassol players
Israeli Premier League players
Hapoel Haifa F.C. players
Portugal youth international footballers
Portugal under-21 international footballers
Portuguese expatriate footballers
Expatriate footballers in Cyprus
Expatriate footballers in Israel
Portuguese expatriate sportspeople in Cyprus
Portuguese expatriate sportspeople in Israel